KTND "Thunder 93.5" is a radio station located at 93.5 FM and licensed to Aspen, Colorado. It airs a classic hits format and is owned by Roaring Fork Broadcasting Co LLC.

External links

TND